Vasil Oleksandrovych Volga (born March 5, 1968, in Sievierodonetsk, Ukrainian SSR) is a Ukrainian politician and leader of the Ukrainian political party Union of Leftists.

Biography
Volga was a candidate in the 2004 Ukrainian presidential election, nominated by the non-governmental organization "Public Control", of which he has been chair since 2000. Born in 1968 he was one of the youngest presidential candidates. From 1997 to 2000 he was chair of the International Union of Ukrainian Entrepreneurs. The major thesis of his program is great attention to public control of governmental organizations achieved by the creation of labor unions and advisory panels in these organizations.

Volha was a member of the Socialist Party of Ukraine until his exclusion from that party in 2007. He then created his new party Union of Leftists.

Volha was appointed the head of the state commission for the regulation of financial services markets on Match 22, 2010 by President Yanukovych.

Volha was detained on July 19, 2011, and charged with bribe taking and 2 months later for embezzlement. He was dismissed by President Yanukovych from the post of the head of the state commission for financial service markets regulation on July 25, 2011. Volha was sentenced to 5 years imprisonment on 24 September 2012.

References

1968 births
Living people
People from Sievierodonetsk
Socialist Party of Ukraine politicians
Union of Leftists politicians
Fifth convocation members of the Verkhovna Rada
Ukrainian prisoners and detainees
Corruption in Ukraine
Candidates in the 2004 Ukrainian presidential election
Prisoners and detainees of Ukraine